Negative search is the elimination of information which is not relevant from a mass of content in order to present to a user a range of relevant content.

Negative search is different from both positive search and discovery search. Positive search uses the selection of relevant content as its primary mechanism. Discovery calculates relatedness (between user intent and content) to present users with relevant alternatives of which they may not have been aware.

Negative search applies to those forms of searches where the user has the intention of finding a specific, actionable piece of information but lacks the knowledge of what that specific information is or might be.

Negative search can also apply to searches where the user has a clear understanding of negative intent (what they don't want) rather than what they do.

Examples of negative intent are:

- Job searching: someone knows they want a new job but they have no idea what it might be. They just know what they don't want.

- Online dating: someone is looking for a dating partner, but cannot identify what criteria they are looking for. They just know what they don't want.

- An investigator is looking for a car but has no other information on that car on which to base a search.

Negative search classifiers

If there are two forms of search (positive and negative) it follows that there are two forms of classifier models: inclusive classifiers and exclusive classifiers.

Countries of the world are a good example of a MECE list. A positive search for the country Kenya would identify content referencing Kenya and present it. A negative search for the country Kenya would exclude all content relating to other countries in the world leaving the user with content of some relevance to Kenya.

Irrelevancy as a desirable construct

Positive search tends to view irrelevancy as undesirable. Having a system actively identify and pursue irrelevant content for the purpose of elimination from a user experience may prove a highly powerful mechanism.

It follows that positive and negative search are not mutually exclusive and that a more powerful search may result from the combination of selection and elimination as tools to empower user experience in negative searches.

Degrees of passivity

Positive search involves an active search by a user with no degree of passivity (or openness). For example: "I am only interested in the Hilton Hotel in Vientiane on New Year's Eve."

Discovery involves a simultaneous secondary more Passive search by the user while they are involved in a positive search. For example: "I am interested in the Hilton Hotel in Vientiane on New Year's Eve but if there's a better hotel, let me know."

Negative search also involves an active search but with a much higher degree of passivity (or openness to discovery). For example: "I need a holiday and really don't care where as long as its good."

Searchers can be active in one dimension (positive search) while simultaneously being passive to alternatives or what they don't know they're looking for in many dimensions. In discovery they are passive in a small number of dimensions but in negative search they are passive in many or all dimensions.

References

Information retrieval techniques